Richard Alfred Weiss (September 18, 1963 – June 25, 1997), known as Rich Weiss, was a West German-born, American slalom kayaker who competed from the mid-1980s to the mid-1990s. He won a silver medal in the K1 event at the 1993 ICF Canoe Slalom World Championships in Mezzana.

Weiss also competed in two Summer Olympics, earning his best finish of sixth in the K1 event in Atlanta in 1996. His finish in the 1992 Olympics in Barcelona was mired in controversy when the television replay showed a judge's error cost him a bronze medal.

Weiss was born in Munich, and earned a B.S. in Geological Engineering from the Colorado School of Mines, an M.S. in Hydrogeology from Penn State University, and a Ph.D. in Geological Sciences at the University of British Columbia. He founded and owned an environmental consulting company, Weisswater Associates.

He drowned in a kayaking accident on the White Salmon River in Washington state in 1997. Preparing for a race with a friend, he unsuccessfully attempted to run Big Brother, a Class-V rapid with a 30-foot waterfall. His wife, Rosi, gave birth soon afterwards to a boy whom she named "River". The accidental death of a world-class paddler was the subject of much reflection and soul-searching in the whitewater community. The town of Steamboat Springs, Colorado dedicated a park, with a statue, in his honor.

World Cup individual podiums

See also
List of Pennsylvania State University Olympians

References

Sports-reference.com profile

1963 births
1997 deaths
American male canoeists
Canoeists at the 1992 Summer Olympics
Canoeists at the 1996 Summer Olympics
Olympic canoeists of the United States
German emigrants to the United States
Accidental deaths in Washington (state)
Medalists at the ICF Canoe Slalom World Championships
Canoeing deaths
Deaths by drowning in the United States